General elections were held in Botswana on 30 October 2004, alongside local elections. The result was a ninth consecutive victory for the ruling Botswana Democratic Party (BDP), which won 44 of the 57 seats in the National Assembly.

Background
The Independent Electoral Commission had a campaign to encourage voter registration, with a target of registering at 500,000 voters. Although it achieved its target, registering around 61% of the estimated 900,000 voting-age population, the opposition Botswana National Front (BNF) accused it of making errors in the registration process.

Campaign
For the first time, the election campaign involved parties using billboards. However, the opposition claimed that their media access was restricted, and a study by the Media Institute of Southern Africa showed that the BDP had received over 50% of the election coverage. The BDP campaigned on promises to improve training, expand electricity and water supplies and amend laws that discriminated against women. The campaign of the opposition parties focused on unemployment and poverty. However, although the BNF, Botswana Alliance Movement (BAM) and Botswana People's Party (BPP), entered into an electoral pact agreement in 2003, their campaigns were marked by open personal attacks between them and their leaders.

Fifty-six of the 57 constituencies were contested, with Vice President Ian Khama unopposed in the Serowe North constituency.

Conduct
For the first time, international monitors were able to observe the elections, with delegations from the Southern African Development Community, the African Union, the Commonwealth and the United Nations in attendance. There were 11,000 personnel from the Independent Electoral Commission involved in running the elections.

Results

References

Botswana
Elections in Botswana
General election
October 2004 events in Africa